KLE Society's Law College is a private law school situated in Bangalore, Karnataka, India. It is under the name of KLE and is affiliated to Karnataka State Law University.

History
KLE Society’s Law College was established in 1975. It started with a 3 Year LL. B. Degree Course, a Five Year Integrated Degree Course in B.A., LL.B was introduced in the year 1996 and 5 year BBA, LL.B was introduced in the year 2011.

Rankings
 
KLE Society's Law College was ranked 11 among private law colleges in India by Outlook India in 2022.

References

External links 
 

Educational institutions established in 1975
Law schools in Karnataka